Opitz is a surname. Notable people with the surname include:
 John M. Opitz, American geneticist
 Martin Opitz, German poet
 Lucille Opitz, German speed skater
 Mark Opitz, Australian record producer
 Rudolf Opitz, German lithographer
 Simone Opitz, East German cross country skier 
 Reinhard Opitz, German left-wing intellectual and social scientist
 Franz K. Opitz, Swiss painter
 Ted Opitz, Canadian politician

See also 
 Smith–Lemli–Opitz syndrome, a metabolic and developmental disorder
 Opitz trigonocephaly syndrome, type of cephalic disorder
 Opitz–Kaveggia syndrome, genetic syndrome
 Autosomal dominant opitz G/BBB syndrome, disorder caused by the deletion of a small piece of chromosome 22

German-language surnames